Jorge Andrés Carrascal Guardo (born 25 May 1998) is a Colombian professional footballer who plays as an attacking midfielder for Russian club CSKA Moscow.

Club career
Born in Cartagena, Carrascal was a Millonarios youth graduate, after starting it out at CD Heroicos. He made his professional – and Categoría Primera A – debut on 9 November 2014 at the age of only 16, coming on as a late substitute for Luis Hernán Mosquera in a 0–1 away loss against Deportes Tolima.

Carrascal only appeared again 7 November 2015, again from the bench in a 0–2 loss at Independiente Medellín. His first (and only) start for the club came on 17 March 2016, in a 2–0 Copa Colombia home win against Bogotá.

On 25 May 2016 Carrascal moved abroad, signing a five-year deal with Spanish La Liga side Sevilla FC, being immediately assigned to the reserves in Segunda División.

On 13 July 2017 he transferred to Karpaty Lviv in Ukraine at first on loan for a year. In April of 2018 Carrascal was recognized as a player of the month in the Ukrainian Premier League.

In 2021, Carrascal won the Argentine Primera División with River Plate.

On 18 February 2022, Carrascal joined CSKA Moscow on loan from River Plate for the remainder of the 2021–22 season. On 20 May 2022, CSKA confirmed that the purchase clause in the loan contract has been activated and Carrascal will be under contract with CSKA from the 2022–23 season until 2026.

Honours
River Plate
 Recopa Sudamericana: 2019

Career statistics

References

External links

1998 births
Living people
Sportspeople from Cartagena, Colombia
Colombian footballers
Colombian expatriate footballers
Colombia youth international footballers
Colombia international footballers
Association football wingers
Categoría Primera A players
Millonarios F.C. players
Segunda División players
Sevilla Atlético players
Club Atlético River Plate footballers
Expatriate footballers in Argentina
Expatriate footballers in Spain
Colombian expatriate sportspeople in Spain
Ukrainian Premier League players
FC Karpaty Lviv players
Colombian expatriate sportspeople in Ukraine
Expatriate footballers in Ukraine
Argentine Primera División players
Colombian expatriate sportspeople in Argentina
PFC CSKA Moscow players
Russian Premier League players
Colombian expatriate sportspeople in Russia
Expatriate footballers in Russia